Filé is a cajun music ensemble from Louisiana founded in 1983. The group is named after filé powder, a spice used in cajun food.

The group was founded by Ward Lormand and Kevin Shearin, who had previously played together in the band Cush-Cush from 1980. Peter Stevens joined the group for their debut in 1985, while D'Jalma Garnier and David Egan joined in the early 1990s.

Members
Current
 Ward Lormand – accordion, percussion, vocals
 Kevin Shearin – bass, guitar, vocals
 Peter Stevens – percussion
 D'Jalma Garnier – fiddle
 David Egan – keyboards
 Al Berard - Guitar
 Darren Wallace - Fiddle
 Brian Langlinais - Guitar

Former
Michael Shinkman - Trombone

Discography
Live at Mulate's (1985)
Cajun Dance Band (Flying Fish Records, 1987)
Two Left Feet (Flying Fish, 1990)
La Vie Marron (Green Linnet Records, 1996)
Hang On to Your Chapeau (2000)

References
Craig Harris, [ Filé] at Allmusic

Musical groups from Louisiana
Flying Fish Records artists